Gezin is a village in Maden District of Elazığ Province, Turkey. Its population is 1,075 (2021). Formerly Gezin was situated several kilometers east of its present location, but was moved to its present place by the lake. Gezin was a town (belde) between 1992 and the 2013 reorganisation.

References

Villages in Maden District
Kurdish settlements in Turkey